The Weiti River is an estuarine river to the north of Auckland in the North Island of New Zealand. The upper stretches of the river are heavily grown with mangroves but with care, small craft can navigate it as far as Silverdale at high tide. Stillwater is the only other settlement along the river's banks. Wentworth College, based in nearby Gulf Harbour, uses the Weiti River for its rowing training.

Up until the 1950s this river and estuary was known by locals as the Wade river.

References

Hibiscus and Bays Local Board Area
Rivers of the Auckland Region
Rivers of New Zealand
Estuaries of New Zealand
Hauraki Gulf catchment